Edgar Welch Leonard (June 19, 1881 – October 7, 1948) was a Harvard graduate and male tennis player from the United States.

He is best known for his gold medal at the St. Louis Olympics (1904) in the men's doubles event, partnering Beals Wright. In the men's singles event he won a bronze medal. Leonard reached the semifinals of the U.S. National Championships in 1904 and the quarterfinals in 1901 and 1906.

References

External links
 
 

1881 births
1948 deaths
American male tennis players
Harvard University alumni
Olympic bronze medalists for the United States in tennis
Olympic gold medalists for the United States in tennis
Tennis players at the 1904 Summer Olympics
Medalists at the 1904 Summer Olympics